Eastern Air Lines Flight 401 was a scheduled flight from New York JFK to Miami. Shortly before midnight on December 29, 1972, the Lockheed L-1011-1 TriStar crashed into the Florida Everglades, causing 101 total fatalities. Three of the four cockpit crew members, two of the 10 flight attendants, and 96 of the 163 passengers were killed; 75 people survived.

The crash occurred while the entire flight crew were preoccupied with a burnt-out landing gear indicator light. They failed to notice that the autopilot had been disconnected inadvertently and, subsequently, the aircraft gradually lost altitude and crashed. This was the first fatal crash of a wide-body aircraft. It was also the first hull loss and fatal crash of a Lockheed L-1011 TriStar.

Aircraft 
Eastern Air Lines Flight 401 was a regularly scheduled flight from John F. Kennedy International Airport in Queens, New York, to Miami International Airport in Miami, Florida. On the day of the crash, Flight 401 was operated using a Lockheed L-1011-1 TriStar (registration N310EA), which had been delivered to the airline on August 18, 1972.  The aircraft was fleet number 310, and the 10th TriStar delivered to the carrier.

Flight crew 
The flight was commanded by Captain Robert Albin (Bob) Loft, age 55, a veteran pilot ranked 50th in seniority at Eastern Air Lines. Captain Loft had been with the airline for 32 years and had accumulated a total of 29,700 flight hours throughout his flying career. He had logged 280 hours in the L-1011. His flight crew included First Officer Albert John "Bert" Stockstill, 39, who had 5,800 hours of flying experience (with 306 of them in the L-1011), and Flight Engineer Donald Louis "Don" Repo, 51, who had 15,700 hours of flying experience, with 53 of them in the L-1011.

A company employee—technical officer Angelo Donadeo, 47, returning to Miami from an assignment in New York—accompanied the flight crew for the journey, but was officially an off-duty, "nonrevenue passenger".

Flight and crash 

Flight 401 departed JFK Airport in New York on Friday, December 29, 1972, at 21:20EST, with 163 passengers and 13 crew members aboard.

The flight was routine until 23:32, when the airplane began its approach into Miami International Airport. After lowering the gear, First Officer Stockstill noticed that the landing gear indicator, a green light identifying that the nose gear is properly locked in the "down" position, had not illuminated. This was later discovered to be due to a burned-out light bulb. The landing gear could have been manually lowered, nonetheless. The pilots cycled the landing gear, but still failed to get the confirmation light.

Loft, who was working the radio during this leg of the flight, told the tower that they would discontinue their approach to their airport and requested to enter a holding pattern.

The cockpit crew removed the light assembly, and Second Officer Repo was dispatched to the avionics bay beneath the flight deck to check via a small porthole whether the landing gear was indeed down. Fifty seconds after reaching their assigned altitude, Captain Loft instructed First Officer Stockstill to put the L-1011 on autopilot. For the next 80 seconds, the airplane maintained level flight. Then, it dropped , and then again flew level for two more minutes, after which it began a descent so gradual it could not be perceived by the crew. In the next 70 seconds, the airplane lost only , but this was enough to trigger the altitude warning C-chord chime located under the engineer's workstation. The engineer (Repo) had gone below, and no indication was heard of the pilots' voices recorded on the CVR that they heard the chime. In another 50 seconds, the plane was at half its assigned altitude.

As Stockstill started another turn, onto 180°, he noticed the discrepancy. The following conversation was recovered from the flight voice recorder later:

 Stockstill: We did something to the altitude.
 Loft: What?
 Stockstill: We're still at 2,000 feet, right?
 Loft: Hey—what's happening here?

Less than 10 seconds after this exchange, the jetliner crashed:

Cockpit area microphone (CAM): [Sound of click]
CAM: [Sound of six beeps similar to radio altimeter increasing in rate]
CAM: [Sound of initial impact]

The location was west-northwest of Miami,  from the end of runway 9L. The airplane was traveling at  when it hit the ground. When the main part of the fuselage hit the ground, it continued to move through the grass and water, breaking up as it went.

Crash sequence 
The TriStar's port outer wing structure struck the ground first, followed by the number1 engine and the port main undercarriage. Only small fragments of metal marked the wingtip's first contact, followed  further on by three massive  swaths cut through the mud and sawgrass by the aircraft's extended undercarriage before two of the legs were sheared off. Then came scattered parts from the number 1 (port) engine, and fragments from the port wing itself and the port tailplane. About  from the wingtip's initial contact with the ground, the massive fuselage had begun to break up, scattering components from the underfloor galley, the cargo compartments, and the cabin interior. At  along the wreckage trail, the outer section of the starboard wing tore off, gouging a  crater in the soft ground as it did so. From this point on, the breakup of the fuselage became more extensive, scattering metal fragments, cabin fittings, and passenger seats widely.

The three major sections of the fuselage—the most intact of which was the tail assembly—lay in the mud towards the end of the wreckage trail. The fact that the tail assembly—rear fuselage, number2 tail-mounted engine, and remains of the empennage—finally came to rest substantially further forward than other major sections, was probably the result of the number 2 engine continuing to deliver thrust during the actual breakup of the aircraft. No complete cross-section of the passenger cabin remained, and both the port wing and tailplane were demolished to fragments. Incongruously, not far from the roofless fuselage center section with the inner portion of the starboard wing still attached, lay a large, undamaged and fully inflated rubber dinghy, one of a number carried on the TriStar in the event of an emergency water landing. The breakup of the fuselage had freed it from its stowage and activated its inflation mechanism.

Rescue and aftermath 
Robert "Bud" Marquis (1929–2008), an airboat pilot, was out frog gigging with Ray Dickinsin (1929–1988) when they witnessed the crash. They rushed to rescue survivors. Marquis received burns to his face, arms, and legs—a result of spilled jet fuel from the crashed TriStar—but continued shuttling people in and out of the crash site that night and the next day. For his efforts, he received the Humanitarian Award from the National Air Disaster Alliance/Foundation and the "Alumitech – Airboat Hero Award", from the American Airboat Search and Rescue Association.

In all, 75 survived the crash—67 of the 163 passengers and eight of the 10 flight attendants. Despite their own injuries, the surviving flight attendants were credited with helping other survivors and several quick-thinking actions such as warning survivors of the danger of striking matches due to jet fuel in the swamp water and singing Christmas carols to keep up hope and draw the rescue teams' attention, as flashlights were not part of the standard equipment on commercial airliners at the time. Of the cockpit crew, only flight engineer Repo survived the initial crash, along with technical officer Donadeo, who was down in the nose electronics bay with Repo at the moment of impact. Stockstill was killed on impact, while Captain Loft died in the wreckage of the flight deck before he could be transported to a hospital. Repo was evacuated to a hospital, but later died from his injuries. Donadeo, the lone survivor of the four flight-deck occupants, recovered from his injuries. Frank Borman, a former NASA astronaut and Eastern's senior vice president of operations, was awoken at home by a telephone call explaining of a probable crash. He immediately drove to Eastern's Miami offices and decided to charter a helicopter to the crash site, as the swampy terrain made rescue difficult, and Eastern Airlines had not heard any news of progress in rescue efforts. There he was able to land in a swampy patch of grass and coordinate rescue efforts. He accompanied 3 survivors on the helicopter to a hospital including a flight attendant and passenger who lost her baby in the crash. James Hall, Flight Operations and Safety, Miami office, had the task of notifying all the families of the crash victims.

Most of the dead were passengers in the aircraft's midsection. The swamp absorbed much of the energy of the crash, lessening the impact on the aircraft. The mud of the Everglades may have blocked wounds sustained by survivors, preventing them from bleeding to death. However, it also complicated the survivors' recuperation, as organisms in the swamp caused infection, with the potential for gas gangrene. Eight passengers became infected; doctors used hyperbaric chambers to treat the infections. All the survivors were injured; 60 received serious injuries and 17 suffered minor injuries that did not require hospitalization. The most common injuries were fractures of ribs, spines, pelvises, and lower extremities. Fourteen survivors had various degrees of burns.

Investigation 
The National Transportation Safety Board (NTSB) investigation discovered that the autopilot had been inadvertently switched from altitude hold to control wheel steering (CWS) mode in pitch. In this mode, once the pilot releases pressure on the yoke (control column or wheel), the autopilot maintains the pitch attitude of the aircraft until the yoke is again moved. Investigators believe the autopilot switched modes when the captain accidentally leaned against the yoke while turning to speak to the flight engineer, who was sitting behind and to the right of him. The slight forward pressure on the stick would have caused the aircraft to enter a slow descent, maintained by the CWS system.

Investigation into the aircraft's autopilot showed that the force required to switch to CWS mode was different between the A and B channels (respectively). Thus, the switching to CWS in channel A possibly did not occur in channel B, thus depriving the first officer of any indication the mode had changed (channel A provides the captain's instruments with data, while channel B provides the first officer's).

This altitude alert, designed to warn the pilots of an inadvertent deviation from the selected altitude, went unnoticed by the crew. Investigators believe this was due to the crew being distracted by the nose gear light, and because the flight engineer was not in his seat when it sounded, so would not have been able to hear it. Visually, since it was nighttime and the aircraft was flying over the darkened terrain of the Everglades, no ground lights or other visual signs indicated the TriStar was slowly descending.

Captain Loft was found during the autopsy to have an undetected brain tumor in an area that controls vision. However, the NTSB concluded that the captain's tumor did not contribute to the accident.

Cause 
The final NTSB report cited the cause of the crash as pilot error, specifically: "the failure of the flight crew to monitor the flight instruments during the final four minutes of flight, and to detect an unexpected descent soon enough to prevent impact with the ground. Preoccupation with a malfunction of the nose landing gear position indicating system distracted the crew's attention from the instruments and allowed the descent to go unnoticed."

In response to this and other accidents during the 1970s, many airlines started crew resource management training for their pilots. The training is designed to make problem solving in a cockpit much more efficient, thus causing less distraction for the crew. Flashlights are now standard equipment near jumpseats, and all jumpseats are outfitted with shoulder harnesses.

Reported ghost sightings 
During the following months and years, stories began circulating that employees of Eastern Air Lines, and numerous passengers, had reported sightings of the dead crew members, captain Robert Loft and second officer (flight engineer) Donald Repo, sitting aboard other L-1011s (including, in particular, N318EA).

These stories speculated that parts of the crashed aircraft were salvaged after the investigation and refitted into other L-1011s. The reported hauntings were said to be seen only on the planes that used the spare parts. Gossip regarding the sighting of the spirits of Don Repo and Bob Loft spread throughout Eastern Air Lines to the extent that Eastern's management warned employees that they could be dismissed if caught spreading ghost stories.

While Eastern Air Lines publicly denied their planes were haunted, they reportedly removed all the salvaged parts from their L-1011 fleet. Over time, the reporting of ghost sightings stopped. An original floor board from Flight 401 remains in the archives at History Miami in South Florida. Pieces of Flight 401's wreckage can also be found in Ed and Lorraine Warren's Occult Museum in Monroe, Connecticut.

The story of the crash and its aftermath were documented in John G. Fuller's 1976 book The Ghost of Flight 401. Fuller recounts stories of paranormal events aboard other Eastern aircraft and the belief that these were caused by equipment salvaged from the wreckage of Flight 401. A television movie, also titled The Ghost of Flight 401, broadcast by NBC during February 1978. Based on Fuller's book, it emphasized the ghost sightings. On his 1979 album Three Hearts, musician Bob Welch also recorded a song titled "The Ghost of Flight 401".

Eastern Air Lines CEO (and former Apollo astronaut) Frank Borman termed the ghost stories about the crash "garbage". Eastern considered suing for libel, based on assertions of a cover-up by Eastern executives, but Borman opted not to, feeling a lawsuit would merely provide more publicity for the book. Loft's widow and children did sue Fuller, for infringement of Loft's right of publicity, for invasion of privacy, and for intentional infliction of emotional distress, but the lawsuit was dismissed and the dismissal upheld by the Florida Fourth District Court of Appeal.

According to Robert J. Serling's 1980 book From the Captain to the Colonel: An Informal History of Eastern Airlines, the claim that wreckage from Flight 401 was installed and later removed from other Eastern aircraft was false, and no Eastern employees had ever claimed to have seen or believed in the alleged ghost sightings. Skeptic Brian Dunning claims that the origin for the ghost sightings was a joke made by an Eastern Air Lines captain after an emergency landing in which he quipped that he "thought [Don] Repo's ghost was on the plane."

In popular culture 

The crash was documented in Rob and Sarah Elder's 1977 book Crash. A television movie of the same name was broadcast in October 1978. Based on the book, it dramatized the crash, rescue efforts, and NTSB investigation. Eddie Albert featured as "Dunn", a fictionalized version of Captain Robert Loft.

The television movie The Ghost of Flight 401, which was broadcast on NBC during February 1978, offers a fictionalized depiction of the crash and alleged ghost sightings. 

The flight is referenced as part of the Bob Welch song "The Ghost of Flight 401" on his 1979 album Three Hearts.

Footage of the incident appeared in the movie Days of Fury (1980), directed by Fred Warshofsky and hosted by Vincent Price.

The accident and the subsequent ghost story were mentioned by Dan Aykroyd during his appearance on The Tonight Show Starring Johnny Carson on June 6, 1984.

The crash was featured in season five of the Discovery Channel Canada / National Geographic TV series Mayday, in a 2009 episode called "Fatal Distraction".

It is featured in season1, episode3, of the TV show Why Planes Crash, in an episode called "Human Error" (2010).

A similar situation appeared in the Thai movie Dark Flight, directed by Kongkiat Khomsiri, produced in 2012.

The Ghosts of Flight 401, part of the Discovery+ series Shock Docs, emphasizes the supernatural legacy of the crash.

Flight 401 is mentioned in the TV show  Supernatural Season 1 Episode 4 named Phantom Traveler's. 

See also

 Eastern Air Lines Flight 212, a 1974 Eastern Airlines CFIT accident caused by pilot distraction
 Lady Be Good, a B-24 which was similarly reputed to be cursed after salvaged parts from it were reused in other aircraft
 Scandinavian Airlines System Flight 933, a 1969 accident in which the crew were distracted by possible landing gear problems
 Third man factor, an apparent sense that another person is present
 United Airlines Flight 173, a 1978 accident in which the crew were distracted by possible landing gear problems
 ValuJet Airlines Flight 592, a 1996 accident in which an aircraft crashed into the Florida Everglades not far from where Flight 401 crashed

 Notes 

 References 

 External links 

 NTSB Summary
 Flight 401 Survivors
 Flight 401 Survivors Tribute Fund
 CVR transcript
 The Crash of Eastern Airlines Flight 401
 "Eastern Flight 401 The Story of the Crash." The Miami Herald''. Multimedia presentation on flight 401.
 The Crash of Eastern Air Lines Flight 401-Epilogue
 
 
 ASN Aircraft accident Lockheed L-1011-385-1 TriStar 1 N310EA Everglades, FL

Aviation accidents and incidents in the United States in 1972
Airliner accidents and incidents in Florida
Airliner accidents and incidents involving controlled flight into terrain
Airliner accidents and incidents caused by pilot error
1972 in Florida
401
Accidents and incidents involving the Lockheed L-1011
Everglades
History of Miami-Dade County, Florida
December 1972 events in the United States